Joel Taylor (born 1959) is an American drummer who has toured or recorded with artists such as Brian Bromberg, Mike Garson, Al Di Meola, Frank Gambale, Allan Holdsworth, Banned From Utopia, and appears on Yanni's live concert video Tribute.

References

Profile at Reflections  an Unofficial Yanni fan page

External links
Official site

1959 births
Living people
20th-century American drummers
American male drummers
Place of birth missing (living people)
20th-century American male musicians
OHM (band) members